Thick as a Brick – Live in Iceland is a live album and Blu-ray/DVD by Jethro Tull frontman Ian Anderson. The live concert was recorded in Harpa concert hall, Reykjavík, Iceland on 22 June 2012.

It was part of the Thick as a Brick Tour by Ian Anderson and his touring band in Europe and the United States throughout 2012 and 2013.

Track listing

Disc one
 Thick as a Brick

Disc two
From a Pebble Thrown
Pebbles Instrumental
Might Have Beens
Upper Sixth Loan Shark
Banker Bets, Banker Wins
Swing It Far
Adrift and Dumfounded
Old School Song
Wootton Bassett Town
Power and Spirit
Give Till It Hurts
Cosy Corner
Shunt and Shuffle
A Change Of Horses
Confessional
Kismet in Suburbia
What-ifs, Maybes and Might-have-beens

Blu-ray/DVD only 
Interview with Ian Anderson
Workshop performance of “Someday The Sun Won’t Shine For You” with Montreux Jazz Festival founder Claude Nobs
“Banker Bets, Banker Wins” filmed live at Montreux 2012

Personnel
 Ian Anderson – flute, Steel-string guitar, acoustic guitar, vocals
 Florian Opahle – electric guitar
 David Goodier – bass guitar, glockenspiel
 Anna Phoebe – violin
 John O'Hara – keyboards, accordion
 Scott Hammond – drums, percussion
 Ryan O'Donnell – singing, dance and mime

See also
 Thick as a Brick
 Thick as a Brick 2

References

External links
 "Thick as a Brick - Live in Iceland" on Jethro Tull website

Concert films
Ian Anderson albums
2014 live albums
Albums produced by Ian Anderson
Jethro Tull (band) live albums
Jethro Tull (band) video albums
Eagle Records live albums